Bebandem District is a village and district (kecamatan) in Karangasem Regency, Bali, Indonesia.  The area is 81.51 km2 and at the 2010 Census the population numbered 45,160. the latest official estimate (as at mid 2019) is 46,390.

Administrative division 
Bebandem District consists of eight villages (kelurahan) : 
Bebandem Village 
Giri Buana Village 
Budakeling Village 
Bungaya Village 
Bungaya Kangin Village 
Jungutan Village 
Macang Village 
Sibetan village

References

Populated places in Bali